The 2023 Men's Tour Down Under was a road cycling stage race that took place between 17 and 22 January 2023 in and around Adelaide, South Australia. It was the 23rd edition of the Tour Down Under and the first race of the 2023 UCI World Tour.

Teams
All eighteen UCI WorldTeams are invited automatically and obliged to enter a team of up to seven riders into the race.

UCI WorldTeams

 
 
 
 
 
 
 
 
 
 
 
 
 
 
 
 
 
 

UCI ProTeams

 

National Teams

 UniSA–Australia

Route

Stages

Prologue
17 January 2023 — Adelaide,

Stage 1
18 January 2023 — Tanunda to Tanunda,

Stage 2
19 January 2023 — Brighton to Victor Harbor,

Stage 3
20 January 2023 — Norwood to Campbelltown,

Stage 4
21 January 2022 — Port Willunga to Willunga Township,

Stage 5
22 January 2023 — Unley to Mount Lofty,

Classification leadership table

Classification standings

General Classification

Mountains Classification 

|-

Sprints Classification

Young Rider Classification

Teams classification

References

External links

2023
2023 UCI World Tour
2023 in Australian sport
January 2023 sports events in Australia